This is a list of gay villages, urban areas with generally recognized boundaries that unofficially form a social center for LGBT people.  They tend to contain a number of gay lodgings, B&Bs, bars, clubs and pubs, restaurants, cafés and other similar businesses. Some may be gay getaways, such as Provincetown or Guerneville.

Australia

Argentina

Brazil

Canada

Chile

France

Japan

Mexico

New Zealand

Papua New Guinea

Portugal

Spain

Taiwan

Thailand

United Kingdom

United States

Sources

References

External links 
 The Gay & Lesbian Atlas (Urban Institute Press)
 epodunk.com
 NYC LGBT Historic Sites Project

 
Gay villages
Gay villages

fr:Quartier gay#Quartiers gay dans le monde